The Technical Information Project (TIP) was an early database project. TIP included over 25,000 records and was used to explore bibliographic coupling between works.

Developed by Meyer Mike Kessler at MIT around 1964, some of the innovations in TIP included the use of wild cards, and boolean searching.

References
 Chronology of Information Science
Bourne, C.P. and Hahn, T. B. A History of  Online Information Services, 1963-1976. Cambridge, MA:  MIT Press, 2003.

Bibliographic databases and indexes